The 1971 Bolivian Primera División, the first division of Bolivian football (soccer), was played by 12 teams. The champion was Oriente Petrolero.

National Stage

Group A

Group B

Group C

Final Group

External links
 Official website of the LFPB 

Bolivian Primera División seasons
Bolivia
1971 in Bolivian sport